Misch Kohn (1916 – 2003) was an American artist. His works are part of the collections of several major museums including the Museum of Modern Art in New York City and National Gallery of Art in Washington, D.C.

Kohn was born in Kokomo, Indiana. He studied at the Herron School of Art in Indianapolis.

Several of his works are held by the Philadelphia Museum of Art.

References

1916 births
2003 deaths
Painters from Indiana
People from Kokomo, Indiana
Herron School of Art and Design alumni
20th-century American painters